Matheus Alfredo Cadorini da Silva (born 1 September 2002), known as Matheus Cadorini, is a Brazilian footballer who plays as a forward for Internacional.

Club career
Born in Taubaté, São Paulo, Cadorini was an Audax youth graduate. He made his senior debut on 19 September 2018, coming on as a second-half substitute in a 1–2 home loss against Ituano, for the year's Copa Paulista.

On 10 October 2020, Cadorini moved to Internacional on loan until December 2021, being initially assigned to the under-20s. He first appeared with the main squad on 1 March 2021, replacing Vinicius Mello in a 1–0 Campeonato Gaúcho home win over Juventude, as the club fielded a younger squad.

On his Série A debut on 10 October 2021, Cadorini replaced Yuri Alberto at half-time and scored his team's fifth in a 5–2 home routing of Chapecoense. On 3 December, he signed a permanent contract with Inter until 2025.

Career statistics

References

External links
Internacional profile 

2002 births
Living people
People from Taubaté
Brazilian footballers
Association football forwards
Campeonato Brasileiro Série A players
Grêmio Osasco Audax Esporte Clube players
Sport Club Internacional players
Footballers from São Paulo (state)